Liberi is an Italian surname. Notable people with the surname include:

 Dawn M. Liberi (born 1954), diplomat, international development expert, former US Ambassador to Burundi
 Marco Liberi (1640–1687), Italian painter of the Baroque period
 Pietro Liberi (1605–1687), Italian painter of the Baroque era

See also
Libera (surname)
Libero (disambiguation)

Italian-language surnames